Moxico may refer to:

 Moxico (province)
 Moxico (municipality)